Elections for the 10th Provincial assembly of Sindh were held on 6 October 1993, along with general election for National Assembly of Pakistan & provincial elections in Punjab, Balochistan & N.W.F.P.

List of members of the 10th Provincial Assembly of Sindh 
The tenure of the 10th Provincial assembly of Sindh was from 18 October 1993, till 7 November 1996.

References 

Provincial Assembly of Sindh
Politics of Sindh